Grafton Downtown Commercial Historic District is a national historic district located at Grafton, Taylor County, West Virginia. It encompasses 72 contributing buildings and two contributing structures. They include the business and commercial core of Grafton. Most of the buildings in the district date from 1890-1920 and are generally of brick or frame construction.  Notable buildings include the Grafton Hotel and the B & O station, both built in 1911 and the Post Office built in 1913.  Located in the district and separately listed is the Andrews Methodist Church.

It was listed on the National Register of Historic Places in 1984.

References

National Register of Historic Places in Taylor County, West Virginia
Historic districts in Taylor County, West Virginia
Beaux-Arts architecture in West Virginia
Buildings designated early commercial in the National Register of Historic Places
Buildings and structures in Taylor County, West Virginia
Italianate architecture in West Virginia
Historic districts on the National Register of Historic Places in West Virginia